The Stolpersteine in the Moravskoslezský kraj lists the Stolpersteine in the Moravian-Silesian Region (before 2001 "Ostrava Region") in the easternmost part of Moravia. Stolpersteine is the German name for stumbling blocks collocated all over Europe by German artist Gunter Demnig. They remember the fate of the Nazi victims being murdered, deported, exiled or driven to suicide.

Generally, the stumbling blocks are posed in front of the building where the victims had their last self chosen residence. The name of the Stolpersteine in Czech is: Kameny zmizelých, stones of the disappeared.

The lists are sortable; the basic order follows the alphabet according to the last name of the victim.

Český Těšín

Krnov

Ostrava

Příbor

Dates of collocations 
The Stolpersteine in the Kraj Vysočina were collocated by the artist himself on the following dates:
 Český Těšín: 30 October 2012
 Krnov: 19 July 2013 and 16 September 2014
 Ostrava
 10 June 2010 (Poděbradova 826/27 - Robert Engel, Herta Engelová, Tomas Engel, Ferdinand Goldberger, Helene Goldbergerová, Třída 28. října 6 - Otto Pick, Třída 28. října 41 - Adolf Rix, Freda Rixová, Nádražní třída 26 - Emilie Slatnerová, Žofie Slatnerová, Tyršova 12 - Pavel Slatner, Zikmund Slatner, Berta Slatnerová, Edita Slatnerová, Antonína Macka 4 - Růžena Sommerová, Gertruda Stillerová, Ilse Stillerová, Nádražní třída 3 - Irena Wasserbergerová, Chelčického 3 - Rudolf Rosenstein, Marie Rosensteinová, Franta Rosenstein, Poštovní 345 - Růžena Schönfeldová, Puchmajerova 8 - Karolina Rothová. " http://www.moap.cz/hp-materialy/id=770/) 
 14. Aug. 2010, 26. Sep. 2010, 9. Nov. 2010
5 August 2015
 Příbor: 19 July 2013 not clarified: 25. Jan. 2012

A collocation was also announced for 16 September 2014 in Doubrava u Orlové but could not be verified till now.

See also 
 List of cities by country that have stolpersteine
 Stolpersteine in the Czech Republic

External links

 stolpersteine.eu, Demnig's website
 holocaust.cz

References

Moravskoslezský kraj